Emplectonema is a genus of worms belonging to the family Emplectonematidae.

The species of this genus are found in Europe, Southern Asia and Northern America.

Species:

Emplectonema bocki 
Emplectonema bonhourei 
Emplectonema buergeri 
Emplectonema neesii

References

Monostilifera
Nemertea genera